Lars Lallerstedt (born 1938) is a Swedish designer and industrial designer, one of the pioneers within Swedish industrial design. Grandson of professor Erik Lallerstedt, son of architect Lars-Erik Lallerstedt and brother of Erik Lallerstedt, Swedish chef and restaurateur.

Lallerstedt has been active within a number of different areas: design concepts for barn constructions for Alfa Laval since 1984, medical appliances, consumer products, hi-fi systems, telephones, radio and telecommunication equipment, open stoves etc. He was engaged by Sonab 1969–74 and designed minimalistic loud-speakers and amplifiers with a trend-setting character.

Lars Lallerstedt was among those who founded the industrial design education at the University College of Arts, Crafts and Design (Konstfack) in Stockholm, where he lectured since 1976. He was the first professor in industrial design in Sweden, 1986–92, and the head of Konstfack 1999–2003.

Lars Lallerstedt is engaged in the Stockholm School of Entrepreneurship, a cooperation organization between different educations in Stockholm. He has designed several exhibitions, such as the Design: Stockholm at the Stockholms Stadsmuseum and the world's largest design archive, created by the center for business and industry history in Stockholm och Svensk Form.

References

1938 births
Living people
Swedish industrial designers